General Ahmed Boutaleb ( – born 1946 in Tahla, Taza province) is the Ex-Inspector of the Royal Moroccan Air Force.

Ahmed Boutaleb joined the air force in 1964 as part of a new class of air force officers that were recruited after the 1963 sand war. In 1977 he held the rank of captain.

Towards the end of Hassan II's reign, Boutaleb was appointed as the aide-de-camp of then crown prince Sidi Mohammed and was promoted sometime afterwards to the rank of Colonel Major then to his current position, replacing General Abdelaziz Alaoui M'rani. He had started his career in the military as a C-130 pilot and was trained in the United States.

Ahmed Boutaleb is from the Beni Ourain (also known as Beni Warain), a Zenata tribe of the region south of Taza.

See also
Mustapha Adib (activist)
Abdelaziz Bennani
Housni Benslimane
Military of Morocco

References

Moroccan military personnel
People from Taza
Living people
Moroccan generals
1946 births